"Battleship Grey" is a song by Dutch DJ and producer DJ Tiësto with vocals from English singer Kirsty Hawkshaw. It appeared on Tiësto's first album, In My Memory, and on Hawkshaw's album, Meta Message.

The chill-out remix created by Danish duo Miro led to the 2001 release of a promotional single in the United Kingdom. 300 copies of the single were released through Nebula Records, with a further 100 copies on other labels.

Formats and track listings

12" vinyl
Nebula 12" vinyl
 "Battleship Grey" 
 "Battleship Grey"

Official versions
 Original Mix – (5:13)
 Miro Remix – (6:27)

Releases

References

Tiësto songs
2001 songs
2001 singles
Songs written by Tiësto